Protanypus is a genus of non-biting midges in the subfamily Diamesinae of the bloodworm family Chironomidae.

Species
The genus includes the following species:

 P. caudatus Edwards, 1924
 P. forcipatus (Egger, 1863)
 P. hamiltoni Saether, 1975
 P. morio (Zetterstedt, 1838)
 P. pseudomorio Makarchenko, 1982
 P. ramosus Saether, 1975
 P. saetheri Wiederhol, 1975

References

Chironomidae